The 2018 NCHC Tournament was the fifth tournament in league history. It was played between March 9 and March 17, 2018. Quarterfinal games were played at home team campus sites, while the final four games were played at the Xcel Energy Center in Saint Paul, Minnesota. By winning the tournament, Denver received the NCHC's automatic bid to the 2018 NCAA Division I Men's Ice Hockey Tournament.

Format
The first round of the postseason tournament features a best-of-three games format. All eight conference teams participate in the tournament. Teams are seeded No. 1 through No. 8 according to their final conference standing, with a tiebreaker system used to seed teams with an identical number of points accumulated. The top four seeded teams each earn home ice and host one of the lower seeded teams.

The winners of the first round series advance to the Xcel Energy Center for the NCHC Frozen Faceoff. The Frozen Faceoff uses a single-elimination format. Teams are re-seeded No. 1 through No. 4 according to the final regular season conference standings.

Conference standings
Note: GP = Games played; W = Wins; L = Losses; T = Ties; PTS = Points; GF = Goals For; GA = Goals Against

Bracket
Teams are reseeded after the first round

* denotes overtime periods

Results
All times are local.

Quarterfinals

(1) St. Cloud State vs. (8) Miami

(2) Denver vs. (7) Colorado College

(3) Minnesota–Duluth vs. (6) Western Michigan

(4) North Dakota vs. (5) Omaha

Semifinals

(1) St. Cloud State vs. (4) North Dakota

(2) Denver vs. (3) Minnesota–Duluth

Third place

(3) Minnesota–Duluth vs. (4) North Dakota

Championship

(1) St. Cloud State vs. (2) Denver

Tournament awards

Frozen Faceoff All-Tournament Team
F Henrik Borgström (Denver)
F Nick Poehling (St. Cloud State)
F Logan O'Connor (Denver)
D Ian Mitchell (Denver)
D Jack Ahcan (St. Cloud State)
G Tanner Jaillet* (Denver)
* Most Valuable Player(s)

References

NCHC Men's Ice Hockey Tournament
2018
Ice hockey in Minnesota
College sports in Minnesota
2018 in sports in Minnesota
March 2018 sports events in the United States